The Islamic Front for the Iraqi Resistance (Arabic: الجبهة الإسلامية للمقاومة العراقية - جامع, al-Jabha el-Islamiya lil-Moqawama al-Iraqiya) abbreviated JAMI, was a Sunni islamist insurgent group in Iraq, fighting the U.S.-led Coalition as a part of the Iraqi Insurgency. The group announced itself in around May 2004. The nationalist group has affirmed several times that it only focuses on fighting U.S. forces, not Iraqis. It is believed that JAMI has affiliations with the Republican Guard and that some of the JAMI members might be ex-members of the Iraqi Republican Guard. JAMI's field of operations stretches from Baghdad to Anbar Governorate, Saladin Governorate and Diyala Governorate.

The group is believed to be of an ikhwan background, similar to the Islamic Resistance Movement.

External links 

 Website of JAMI (In Arabic)

Arab militant groups
Factions in the Iraq War
Iraqi insurgency (2003–2011)
Islamist insurgent groups
Muslim Brotherhood
Rebel groups in Iraq